Paleohaemoproteus is an extinct genus of Haemoproteus like organisms.

The type species and only known example is that of an isolate found in the abdominal cavity of a female biting midge trapped 100 million years ago in amber found in Myanmar.

The amber has been dated to the Early Cretaceous epoch.

References

Parasites of Diptera
Haemosporida
Apicomplexa genera
Prehistoric SAR supergroup genera